Duice was an American Miami bass duo consisting of Los Angeles native Ira 'L.A. Sno' Brown and Barbados native Anthony 'Creo-D' Darlington. The two were enlisted in the military at Fort Gordon, Georgia when they were discovered. Their lone hit single, "Dazzey Duks", was an instant smash in 1993, selling over two million copies and peaking at number 12 on the Billboard Hot 100 chart. The single was certified 2× platinum on January 27, 1994, by the RIAA. Their album, Dazzey Duks, was certified gold on the same date. The song was inspired by the short shorts worn by the character Daisy Duke on the CBS TV series The Dukes of Hazzard. L.A. Sno later produced the gold certified "Whatz Up Whatz Up" along with Playa Poncho for the first So So Def Bass All Stars project. L.A. Sno also produced and co-wrote the first single for the LaFace Records Bass project entitled "And Then There Was Bass", following this with "My Baby Daddy" for B-Rock and the Biz.

Discography
1993: Dazzey Duks - RIAA: Gold - US #84, US R&B #26
1994: Shake

References

External links

American hip hop groups
American musical duos
Musical groups established in 1992
Musical groups disestablished in 1995
Hip hop duos
Miami bass groups